The American Women quarters program is a series of quarters featuring notable women in U.S. history, commemorating the centennial of the Nineteenth Amendment to the United States Constitution. The United States Mint is issuing five designs each year from 2022 to 2025 for 20 total designs. One woman will be honored on the reverse of each coin, selected for "contributions to the United States in a wide spectrum of accomplishments and fields, including but not limited to suffrage, civil rights, abolition, government, humanities, science, space, and arts." The obverse depicts George Washington with a new design.

The program was authorized by the Circulating Collectible Coin Redesign Act of 2020, sponsored by Representatives Barbara Lee and Anthony Gonzalez. The original proposal was for 56 quarters, honoring one woman from each state and territory, but with a set of circulating coins intended to be released in 2026 for the United States Semiquincentennial, it was amended to be shorter. One of the five quarters in that set will also feature a woman. It replaced an alternative proposal of quarters featuring animals or endangered species. It will be followed in 2027–2030 with a series depicting youth sports.

It succeeds the America the Beautiful quarters and Washington Crossing the Delaware quarter. Some coin collectors were critical of the "seemingly unending" proposal to continue to issue five new quarter designs every year for a third decade. Many numismatists are more interested in redesigns of other denominations and less frequent releases.

Designs

Obverse 
Laura Gardin Fraser's portrait of George Washington, which was originally submitted in 1931, was selected by the Commission of Fine Arts and Citizens Coinage Advisory Committee to appear on the obverse of the American Women quarters.  The right-facing bust had been used for the 1999 George Washington half eagle for the 200th anniversary of Washington's death.

Reverse 
The United States Secretary of the Treasury selects the women featured for the series in consultation with the Smithsonian Institution's American Women's History Initiative, the National Women's History Museum, and the Congressional Caucus for Women's Issues. Recommendations for women honorees were solicited from the public in 2021.

Honorees featured in 2022 are

Maya Angelou, the first Black woman featured on U.S. currency. Designed by Emily Damstra, who said her depiction of Angelou "convey[s] the passionate way she lived". She indicated that the bird in flight that silhouetted Angelou's arms was modeled on a Purple martin, which is native to Angelou's home state of Arkansas, and symbolized her autobiography I Know Why the Caged Bird Sings. Oprah Winfrey called the design "a true treasure" and "an incredible moment" to commemorate her friend and poet's life. Because a bust portrait was not permitted, Damstra chose to limit the details in the quarter, balancing negative space.
Sally Ride, the first LGBT person on U.S. currency. Her partner Tam O'Shaughnessy said Ride's design by the Space Shuttle's window reflected her quote, "But when I wasn’t working, I was usually at a window looking down at Earth." It shows her wearing a patch with an element Ride designed for the STS-7 mission that represented her being the first American woman in space. The design was unveiled at the 2021 Space Symposium.
Wilma Mankiller; her quarter was released at an event at the Cherokee National Capitol. The Mint's deputy director said "This coin’s design reflects the strength and determination it took for Wilma Mankiller to become the first woman elected principal chief of the Cherokee Nation and to fight for Native American and women’s rights".
Adelina Otero-Warren, the first Hispanic American on U.S. currency.
Anna May Wong, the first Asian American on U.S. currency. Also designed by Emily Damstra, who watched one of Wong's films to prepare her depiction.

Honorees to be featured in 2023 are
Bessie Coleman
Jovita Idár
Edith Kanakaʻole
Eleanor Roosevelt
Maria Tallchief, who also appears on the 2023 Sacagawea dollar

List of designs

References

External links 
 United States Mint America Women Quarters Program

Twenty-five-cent coins of the United States
Circulating commemorative coins of the United States
History of women in the United States
George Washington on United States currency
Maya Angelou
Sally Ride